Faucette is a surname. Notable people with the surname include:

Chuck Faucette (born 1963), American football player and coach
John M. Faucette (1943–2003), American writer
Mark Faucette (born 1958), American ice hockey referee